Michal Horodník (born 29 October 1996) is a Slovak footballer who plays as a midfielder for KFC Komárno in the 2. Liga.

Club career

MFK Košice
He made his debut for Košice on 20 May 2014 against Ružomberok, entering in as a substitute in place of a future Slovak international Erik Pačinda, in the 71st minute of the game.

References

External links
 Eurofotbal profile
 
 Futbalnet profile
 Corgoň Liga profile

1996 births
Living people
Slovak footballers
Association football midfielders
FC VSS Košice players
FK Poprad players
Partizán Bardejov players
MFK Skalica players
KFC Komárno players
Slovak Super Liga players
Sportspeople from Humenné
2. Liga (Slovakia) players